USS Arcadia has been the name of more than one United States Navy ship, and may refer to:

 , a patrol boat possibly in commission during 1918
 , a troop transport in commission from January to September 1919
 , a destroyer tender in commission from 1945 to 1968

See also
 

United States Navy ship names